DNA Doe Project (also DNA Doe Project, Inc. or DDP) is an American nonprofit volunteer organization formed to identify unidentified deceased persons (commonly known as John Doe or Jane Doe) using forensic genealogy. Volunteers identify victims of automobile accidents, homicide, and unusual circumstances and persons who committed suicide under an alias. The group was founded in 2017 by Colleen M. Fitzpatrick and Margaret Press.

History 
Colleen M. Fitzpatrick, who has a doctorate in physics and worked as a nuclear physicist with NASA and the US Department of Defense, was the founder of IdentiFinders, an organization that used Y-chromosomal testing to attempt to identify male killers in unsolved homicides.

Margaret Press is a novelist who has also had careers in computer programming, speech, and language consulting. She retired from computer programming in 2015 and relocated from Salem, Massachusetts, to Sebastopol, California to live near family. As a hobby, Press had begun working in genetic genealogy in 2007, helping friends and acquaintances find relatives, as well as helping adoptees find their biological parents. After reading Sue Grafton's novel "Q" Is for Quarry, about a Jane Doe, Press hoped to use genetic genealogy to also identify unidentified homicide victims.

In 2017, Fitzpatrick, Press, and a small group of volunteers formed the volunteer-based, nonprofit DNA Doe Project (DDP), a 501(c)(3) nonprofit organization based in Sebastopol, California. The two, along with many volunteers, use genetic and traditional genealogy sources in conjunction with DNA from unidentified victims and working with local law enforcement agencies to build family trees through GEDmatch, a free public DNA database. Through this process, they have been able to identify several individuals in cold cases.

In March 2018, the DDP announced it had solved its first case. Known for decades as the "Buckskin Girl", the victim was identified as Marcia Lenore Sossoman (King). Her father had died in 2018, a few months before the identification was made, but other family members gathered to commemorate King when they unveiled a new gravestone bearing her name at her grave in Riverside Cemetery, Miami County, Ohio.

In May 2019, GEDmatch required people who had uploaded their DNA to its site to specifically opt in to allow law enforcement agencies to access their information. This change in privacy policy was forecast to make it much more difficult in the future for law enforcement agencies to solve cold cases using genetic genealogy.

, the organization has assisted in discovering the identity of more than 50 individuals, with 44 cases being publicized as identified.

Procedure

Typical steps 
Each genetic genealogy case at the DDP generally is conducted by the following steps:

 Acceptance of case from law enforcement
 Extraction of DNA sample (sometimes repeated if the first sample proves too degraded for analysis)
 Fundraising for DNA sequencing
 Sequencing of DNA sample
 Bioinformatics "translates" the DNA sequencing into a digital data file that is compatible with GEDmatch
 Uploading DNA data file to GEDmatch
 Genealogical analysis using GEDmatch and other tools
 Tentative identification of the Doe
 Law enforcement verifies identity, typically using fingerprints or a DNA sample provided by an immediate relative

Difficulties 
Some of the difficulties the DDP has encountered when using genetic genealogy to identify bodies have been:

 Adoptions into the family tree, which interrupt the genetic genealogy. Fitzpatrick described this as having to "solve a mystery to solve a mystery". This was the case with a key match of Anthony John Armbrust III, a man found in Park County, Colorado, in 1974.
 Ethnicities for which there are not yet large DNA databases, such as Native American, Hispanic, and African American. Apache Junction Jane Doe found in Arizona in 1992 and Trabuco Canyon John Doe found in 1996 have not yet been identified for this reason. It took extra time to identify Lyle Stevik. Stevik was believed to be of Native-American ancestry while Apache Junction Jane Doe is thought to be of African-American ancestry. Trabuco Canyon John Doe was found to most likely be from a remote part of Latin America, and genealogy research results were too sparse in order to continue research. Shirley Soosay, previously known as Kern County Jane Doe, was of First Nations ancestry and was only identified when the project released information about her ancestry and possible origins, when a family member recognized her.
 Persons descended from or who are themselves recent immigrants to the US, for whom there would not be ancestral genealogy records in the US. For example, Philadelphia Jane Doe is now thought to have had ancestors from Australia and Malta; St. Tammany Parish John Doe is believed to have had ancestors in various Mediterranean Sea countries, including Greece, Italy, Turkey, Romania, and Moldova.
 Intermarriage among related families (endogamy), making discernment of the lines of descent and individuals more difficult. Such families were encountered by researchers in the "Belle in the Well", Broadway Street Jane Doe, and Lyle Stevik cases.
 Amounts of available DNA too small for adequate testing, especially those involving difficult bone extractions. Multiple extractions may be required to obtain a suitable sample.
 Degraded DNA. This was a condition encountered in the Joseph Newton Chandler III case, as well as with Sue Ann Huskey and Tamara Tigard.
 Bacterial/human contamination reducing the amounts of Doe's DNA that can be used for analysis, a problem not usually discovered until sequencing is complete. James Freund and Pamela Buckley's DNA was contaminated with bacteria, and two Does from Washington had their investigations put on hold due to contamination.
 Exceedingly large family trees, which can cause investigations to take weeks or months. This was the case with Joseph Henry Loveless, Karen Knippers, and Kings County and Kern County (2011) Jane Doe and Richard Bunts/Bunce, born in 1793 New York. Richard's case was very difficult because of bacterial contamination which was on his body, for many years.
 In 2020, Margaret Press stated that the COVID-19 pandemic had hampered investigations, particularly those that had been solved and now needed law enforcement to make contact with the families. She stated that many agencies prefer to do these announcements in person but had not been able due to the pandemic and its associated travel restrictions. She added that volunteers and laboratories had also been affected by the pandemic.

Cases

2018 identifications

Marcia King,  "Buckskin Girl"

In 1981, three passerbys found a female murder victim in a ditch in Troy, Ohio. Because the victim was found wearing a distinctive buckskin coat, she was given the name "Buckskin Girl" as the investigation continued. For decades, authorities sought the woman's identity, but to no avail.

At the 2017 American Academy of Forensic Sciences conference, Elizabeth Murray, an Ohio forensic anthropologist, met Colleen M. Fitzpatrick and Margaret Press, founders of the DDP, who discussed what genetic genealogy techniques could do for this case. The victim's body had long since been buried, but a vial of blood had been held in a lab for 37 years. The vial had not been refrigerated, however, resulting in the DNA becoming highly degraded, with only 50 to 75 percent of markers remaining. With the help of Greg Magoon, a senior researcher at Aerodyne Research, they were able to upload this DNA data to GEDmatch.

From this point, the DDP was able to identify the "Buckskin Girl", based on a very close DNA match (to a first cousin once removed). Her name was Marcia Lenore Sossoman (King) from Arkansas, aged 21 at the time of her death. DDP volunteers provided law enforcement with the name of a close relative of King's who lived in Florida. This relative volunteered a DNA sample that confirmed Sossoman's identity. This sample proved to be a match.

After 37 years, her mother was still living at the house where Sossoman had grown up. She had refused to move or change her phone number in hopes that her daughter might return or try to contact her.

"Lyle Stevik"

In September 2001, a man was found to have hanged himself in a motel in Amanda Park, Washington, a town on the Olympic Peninsula. The man had checked in as "Lyle Stevik," which appeared to be an alias. This name appeared drawn from "Lyle Stevick", a character in a Joyce Carol Oates's novel You Must Remember This (1987).

The Grays Harbor County Sheriff's Office spent countless hours in search of the man's true identity but to no avail.

In 2018, the DDP took the case at the request of the county sheriff's office. In order to raise the funds required to complete the necessary DNA analysis, the DDP set up its first-ever "Doe Fund Me" campaign on behalf of the victim. The campaign was a quick success, as, by this time, "Stevik" had gained internet fame among web sleuths. Adequate funds were raised within 24 hours. By March 22, 2018, DDP volunteers had obtained his DNA results and began analyzing through GEDmatch and related genetic genealogy research.

After about 20 volunteers put hundreds of hours into the case, they found a candidate in a 25-year-old young man from California. DNA tests indicated he was of mixed Native-American and Hispanic descent. Authorities contacted the man's family, who conclusively verified his identity using fingerprint samples taken in his childhood, having previously thought the man distanced himself from them. The family has requested that Stevik's identity remain private.

Robert Nichols, aka Joseph Newton Chandler III

Joseph Newton Chandler III, a resident of Eastlake, Ohio, died by suicide in his apartment on July 24, 2002. As authorities sought to identify his heirs, they discovered that his name and identity were fake. The real Joseph Newton Chandler III had died in a Sherman, Texas, car accident at age eight on December 21, 1945. The suicide victim had stolen the boy's identity in 1978 while living in South Dakota. Authorities began a search for the man's true identity.

Extracting DNA proved difficult, as the victim's remains had been cremated. In the year 2000, however, two years before his death, the victim had had a tissue sample taken for a medical treatment. Authorities obtained this sample, but genetic analysis of the sample using traditional law enforcement techniques yielded few clues. In 2016, authorities contacted IdentiFinders, a company run by Colleen M. Fitzpatrick, for help. In examining the man's Y-DNA signature, they determined that his true last name was likely "Nicholas" or some variation.

Chandler became the first case for the DDP. They analyzed the autosomal DNA of the highly degraded sample of the man's DNA, which had been stored in paraffin for about 15 years. Despite the obstacles and after over 2,500 hours of work, the DDP researchers were able to conclusively determine in June 2018 that Joseph Newton Chandler III was Robert Ivan Nichols, son of Silas and Alpha Nichols of New Albany, Indiana. This identification was verified when Robert's son, Phillip Nichols, volunteered a DNA sample, which proved to be a match.

Mary Silvani, aka "Washoe County Jane Doe"

The body of a woman aged between 25 and 35 years was found by hikers on July 17, 1982, in Sheep Flats, Washoe County, Nevada. The woman had been shot in the back of the head as she was bending over, possibly to tie her shoes. The bullet hole on her head had been covered with men's underwear.

The victim wore a light pair of tennis shoes, a sleeveless blue shirt, jeans with a blue bikini bottom in a pocket, and a blue swimsuit underneath. The shirt had been sold at stores in California, Washington, and Oregon.

At the victim's autopsy, a vaccination scar was found on her left arm and another on her abdomen. In addition, one of her toenails had a large bruise underneath. Evidence from the style of dental work she had received indicated that she may have lived in Europe at some point during life. This theory has since been disproved. As possible identities of the decedent, 231 people have been ruled out.

During the years when police struggled to identify her, she was known as "Sheep Flats Jane Doe" or "Washoe County Jane Doe".

In July 2018, it was announced that she had been tentatively identified through genetic genealogy by the DDP. In September 2018, her identity was confirmed by the Washoe County Sheriff's Office. However, the sheriff's office withheld further information due to its ongoing homicide investigation.

In May 2019, the Washoe County Sheriff's Office announced that Washoe County Jane Doe is 33-year-old Mary Edith Silvani. She was born in Pontiac, Michigan, and grew up in Metro Detroit. She later moved to California as an adult.

The perpetrator, James Richard Curry, was also found through forensic genealogy. Curry committed suicide in prison the day following his arrest after being charged with another murder in January 1983.

"Alfred Jake Fuller"

A man aged 40 to 46 was discovered in his apartment in Oakland, Maine, after having died on May 2, 2014, from what were determined to be natural causes. He registered under the name "Alfred Jake Fuller" and provided a birthdate of November 8, 1970. No records were found to match this information, leading investigators to speculate he used an alias. He wore a short goatee and had curly brown hair. A blue discoloration was on the left side of his face, and a large nevus was in between his shoulders. His personal items included a prepaid Visa card and a "fugitive recovery agent" document. He was fully clothed and wore two pieces of jewelry on his neck.

In 2018, the DDP took on his case and was able to identify him that year. His family requested that his identity be withheld for privacy.

Tracey Hobson, aka "Anaheim Jane Doe"

The extensively decomposed remains of a young woman were found at the side of a freeway in the Santa Ana Canyon in Anaheim, California, on August 30, 1987. The victim's body had almost completely skeletonized at the time of discovery, although some fragments of soft tissue were still present upon the remains. The victim—originally called "Anaheim Jane Doe" and also known as Jane Doe 87-04092 EL—was a slender young woman who had medium-length light hair, estimated to have been between 15 and 19 years old when she died, and was speculated to have been a teenage runaway. Her hands had been severed from her body by her killer or killers, likely as a way to prevent identification via fingerprinting.

At the crime scene, enough hair was found upon and near the body to determine that the decedent had either blond or light-brown hair, although no personal belongings beyond a red handkerchief were discovered with her remains. Her skull was forensically reconstructed by Shannon Collis in hopes of identifying the body, determining the decedent also had high cheekbones. One of her front teeth was slightly chipped, while three of her other teeth had visible cavities, and six molars were missing. It is believed that the victim had died approximately six weeks before her body was discovered, meaning she likely died in July 1987. She may possibly have died by repeated stab wounds to her chest area, as incisive damage to two of her ribs suggested. Therefore, her death was ruled as a definite homicide.

In 2018, the identity of Anaheim Jane Doe was established by the DDP, although, due to the case being an ongoing homicide investigation, her identity was not released to the media until January 2019. The decedent was a 20-year-old Anaheim resident named Tracey Coreen Hobson.

Dana Dodd, aka "Lavender Doe"

On October 29, 2006, the badly burned body of a female aged 17 to 25 was discovered in Kilgore, Texas. The victim's cause of death remained undetermined, yet the manner of death was ruled a homicide due to the body having been set on fire deliberately and the victim had been raped.

The DDP took the case in 2018. In January, the organization announced a tentative identification in the case, which would not be released until the suspect's trial concluded. Despite this, Dodd's identity was released on February 11, 2019. She was 21 and last seen in Jacksonville, Florida. Joseph Wayne Burnette, a long-term person of interest in the case, confessed to the murder in August 2018, leading him to be charged with her death (and that of another woman, 28-year-old Felisha Pearson).

2019 identifications

Darlene Norcross, aka "Butler County Jane Doe"

On March 7, 2015, the skeletal remains of a white female were located near Tylersville Road in West Chester Township, Butler County, Ohio. The decedent was examined and estimated to be between 35 and 60 years old at the time of her death, which occurred as early as late 2014. She had unique dental work, including implants. Her DNA did not match any profiles in national databases.

In March 2019, she was identified as Darlene Wilson Norcross. The cause, time, and manner of her death are still undetermined.

Anne Marie "Annie" Lehman, aka "Annie Doe"

On August 19, 1971, the skeleton of a female aged 14 to 25 was discovered in Cave Junction, Oregon. She was white with reddish-colored hair, which was frosted blond. She had slightly protruding upper front teeth and had some fillings in her teeth. Some debris was noted to partially conceal the remains, which were found near the border with California. A hunting knife with deer blood was near the bones.

The decedent wore a checked pink and beige coat, a turtleneck shirt, 34B bra, blue and white underwear, Wrangler jeans, and brown heeled shoes. She had several pieces of jewelry, one being a ring with the letters "AL" scratched into the mother of pearl stone. She also carried 38 cents, the oldest coin dated 1970.

She was reported as wearing a New Zealand-made bra. DNA links were established with New Zealand and Sussex in the United Kingdom by the DDP in 2018.

Additionally, a map of northern California campgrounds was found in one of her pockets.

The DDP began work on the case in 2018 and, through collaboration with the National Center for Missing & Exploited Children and National Missing and Unidentified Persons System, "Annie Doe" was identified as 16-year-old Anne Marie Lehman in March 2019, who was coincidentally known by the nickname "Annie" when alive.

Dana Lowrey, aka "Vicky Dana Doe"

On March 10, 2007, the remains of an unknown female were discovered in a wooded area of Marion County, Ohio. She was aged between 15 and 24 and had died between 2002 and 2006, most likely within the two years prior to her discovery. No clothing or personal effects were found with her body, which was completely skeletonized.

The female had unique physical characteristics. She was predominantly white, but could have had a degree of Hispanic or Asian heritage. She had also suffered damage to one of her front teeth (although this dental damage may have occurred posthumously). She did appear to have otherwise taken considerable care of her teeth although there was no evidence that she had seen a dentist during her lifetime.

In September 2016, authorities announced the possibility that this decedent was a victim of alleged serial killer Shawn Grate, who claimed he had killed this victim after encountering her selling magazines door-to-door. Grate has stated he believes the decedent's name may have been Dana. She was also called "Vicky" by investigators, as she was discovered near Victory Road. In January 2018, the results of isotope analysis conducted upon her remains indicated she likely originated from the Southern US, possibly Texas or Florida. In 2019, Police asked the DDP to help identify the body.

In June 2019, the victim had been identified as Dana Nicole Lowrey. She was 23 at the time of her death in May 2006. She was originally from Minden, Louisiana. She was separated from her husband, with whom she had two young children.

On September 11, 2019, Grate pleaded guilty to her murder and was sentenced to life in prison without parole plus 16 years.

Louise Flesher, aka "Belle in the Well"

Flesher was a woman whose remains were discovered in a well in Chesapeake, Ohio, on April 22, 1981. She had been strangled to death and her murder is believed to have been committed between 1979 and 1981. She was nicknamed "Belle In the Well" based upon the circumstances of her discovery.

The victim was believed between 30 and 60 years old at the time of her death and her body bore signs of arthritis in her back. She had prominent front teeth and cheekbones, and wore multiple layers of clothing. In her possession were a Greyhound Bus ticket and a distinctive coin. In 2018, her autosomal DNA was analyzed by the DDP, and distant relatives were identified in Cabell County, West Virginia. In July 2019, the decedent was identified as Louise Virginia Peterson Flesher. Flesher was born 1915 (about 65 when she died), native to West Virginia, and the mother of three children. She had also resided in Wyoming prior to her death. This case took 14 months and was particularly hard to solve because there was endogamy in her ancestors (the practice of marrying within a specific social group, caste, or ethnic group). Volunteer researchers eventually constructed a family tree of 43,130 people before they identified her.

A year prior to her identification, Flesher had been compared to the unidentified victim, yet she was believed to have been too old to be a match.

Debra Jackson, aka "Orange Socks"

Debra Jackson's body was found face-down and nude in a culvert along a highway in Georgetown, Texas, on October 31, 1979. She had been sexually assaulted and strangled. Along with the pair of socks on her body, she also wore an abalone/mother of pearl stone on a ring.

At the time, Jackson was believed to have been a transient or a runaway. Strong evidence supported this, as she had keys from an Oklahoma motel, long, dirty nails, insect bites (revealed to actually be impetigo scars post-identification), unshaven legs, and a makeshift sanitary pad. She had salpingitis due to having untreated gonorrhea.

Henry Lee Lucas confessed to her murder and was sentenced to death. It was later discovered that police officers from the area had him look at crime scene photos and then confess during interviews, which they would use to gain recognition for solving cold cases.

The DDP took on the case in 2018. On August 6, 2019, "Orange Socks" was identified as 23-year-old Debra Louise Jackson, who was from Abilene, Texas.

Nathaniel Terrance "Terry" Deggs, aka "Mill Creek Shed Man"

On January 11, 2015, the decomposed remains of a man were found in a shed in Mill Creek, Washington. It appeared as though the man, who is called Mill Creek Shed Man, had been living in the shed. He is thought to have died about a year before he was found, but it could have been longer.

The pinky finger on his right hand was missing. Other findings were a "prominent sternal fissure, healed nasal fracture, lumbar scoliosis, and arthritis". No cause of death could be ascertained, and there were no signs of foul play.

Local lore stated that the man had permission to live in the shed from a man who once owned the property on which it was located. A man named Jerry Diggs/Deggs lived on the property where the decedent was found, but there was no proof he and Mill Creek Shed Man were the same person. Jerry apparently gave his birthdate as December 31, 1949. He claimed to be from the East Coast and to have worked as a security guard for a bank. He stated that he was struck in the head during a bank robbery and received a head injury.

On September 26, 2019, the DDP announced the successful identification of Mill Creek Shed Man. His name was being withheld by officials at the time. Snohomish County Medical Examiner's Office (SCMEO) confirmed the identity on September 2, 2019, by comparing the deceased DNA with DNA submitted by the man's sister, whose name was provided by DDP on August 6, 2019. In December, his name was released as 65-year-old Nathaniel Terrance "Terry" Deggs, originally from Baltimore, Maryland, and later the Bronx, New York.

Marcia Bateman, aka "I-196 Jane Doe"

Marcia Bateman's remains were discovered by a hunter not far from the intersection of Interstate 196 (I-196) and County Road 378 in Van Buren County, Michigan, on October 12, 1988. Nearly two months had passed since the 28-year-old was reported missing by her family in Oklahoma. While police in Oklahoma City were actively searching for Bateman, Michigan State Police Detective Sergeant Scott Ernestes said, a connection was never drawn between the remains in Michigan and the missing woman. She was finally identified in November 2019. While Bateman's death is ruled suspicious, Ernestes said there are no suspects.

Michelle "Chelle" Carnall-Burton, aka "Marion County Jane Doe (1987)"

On September 21, 1987, the body of a woman was found in Marion County, Kansas. She had been bound at the hands and ankles, indicating she died from foul play. The victim was at least 16 years old, but most likely between 20 and 35 years old. Her remains were located behind hay bales and hedges at the side of a road and may have been there for months. A tattoo of a cross was located on her shoulder, although most of her body was skeletonized. She was found with healed fractures on her ribs, indicating she had been in some sort of accident months before she died. In 2018, police asked the DDP to help identify her.

The victim was identified in December 2019 as Michelle Evon Carnall-Burton, aged 22 at the time of her murder. She had disappeared from Cherryvale, also southeast Kansas in 1986, and had lost contact with her family.

Joseph Henry Loveless, aka "Clark County John Doe (1979)"

The headless torso of a man was found in 1979, stashed in a burlap sack in Buffalo Cave, near Boise, Idaho. In 1991, a hand was located on the same site, leading to further excavations from which the other hand, one arm, and two legs were discovered. Identification was thought to be impossible, due to the missing head and the huge family tree of the deceased. However, thanks to an 87-year-old California man who agreed to take a DNA test, the remains were identified as those of his grandfather—bootlegger and accused murderer Joseph Henry Loveless. He had been accused of murdering his common-law wife, Agnes Loveless, on May 16, 1916, but had managed to escape imprisonment on May 18, 1916, by using a sawblade hidden in his shoe to cut the prison bar cells. It is unknown what happened to Loveless next, though it was reported in 1916, the year Loveless escaped prison, that he was discovered living at the outskirts of Dubois, Idaho, in a small-sized tent in the Idaho desert. The circumstances surrounding Loveless’ death are, at present, suspected to be murder due to his torso and limbs being separated from his body, and his head and other arm being missing and nowhere to be found. However, it is believed that he died soon after his prison escape in May 1916, as he was found wearing the same clothing detailed in his wanted poster, with Loveless’ cowboy-like hat, his brown coat, and his socks and shoes not being found with his remains in the cave his body was discovered in. Only his red maroon sweater and trousers were found, and a white-pinstripe collar shirt, not mentioned in the wanted poster, was found with the remains as well.

2020 identifications

Kraig King, aka "Barron County John Doe (1982)"
The skeleton of a young man was discovered by loggers on September 21, 1982, in Dallas, Wisconsin. This decedent was estimated to be between 18 and 24 years old at the time of his death. Basic estimations, such as the height, weight, and hair color were later calculated. Hair found with the body was light brown.

It is believed that the decedent had been stabbed to death; this was indicated by tears in his western-style plaid shirt. He was also wearing jeans, a denim jacket, and blue shoes with white stripes.

Some distinctive elements as to the victim were also noted. It is possible that he wore glasses, although none were found at the scene. He had received a large amount of dental work in life; this had been performed shortly before he died. He had also had some kind of surgery on his left knee that involved a screw and staple in the tibia. This kind of surgery would have required an extensive hospitalization period that could have lasted up to six months. Serial numbers on the screw and staple were traced, but this did not lead to the location where they had been purchased.

In December 2019, the DDP announced a tentative match for this victim. On January 7, 2020, the Barron County Sheriff's Department and the DDP announced that, via matches with familial DNA samples, the victim was confirmed to be Kraig Patrick King (b. 1961), of White Bear Lake, Minnesota. King was last seen alive in late 1981, and law enforcement believe he was murdered in April or May 1982. Investigation of his homicide is ongoing.

Sue Ann Huskey, aka "Corona Girl" 

On September 25, 1989, the remains of a woman thought to be 18 to 24 were located in Williamson County, Texas, along I-35. Her ears were pierced, but only one earring was recovered. The victim also wore a necklace containing a white bead in the center, surrounded by two gold-colored beads on either side. She wore a white shirt with the words "Cinco De Corona" with the bottom cut into fringe, leading to her nickname; black pants and a shirt cut into a bra with the words "American Legends" bearing a Native-American design. She wore bikini panties and no shoes. The victim was shot to death.

On January 14, 2020, after several unsuccessful attempts to create a usable file, it was announced that a match to Sue Ann Huskey was confirmed. Huskey was 17 at the time of her murder and was originally from Sulphur Springs, Texas. The match was made possible after the International Commission on Missing Persons (ICMP) was able to extract DNA from dental and bone remains, after decades of attempts by national laboratories.

John Frisch, aka "Peoria County John Doe"
On November 13, 2016, a male torso was found in the Illinois River in Schuyler County, and a skull was later found on June 12, 2017, in Kingston Mines. The remains were named Peoria County John Doe. According to the Peoria County Coroner, the decedent died from blunt force trauma to the head.

On January 27, 2020, the remains were identified as 56-year-old John H. Frisch Jr. Frisch was not reported missing but used addresses in Peoria and Hawaii throughout his life, according to Peoria County Sheriff's Office. Investigators are retracing Frisch's days prior to his body being found. Mr. Frisch's parents are deceased, and he has very limited family in the area.

Tamara Tigard, aka "Lime Lady"

On April 18, 1980, the mummified corpse of a woman was discovered on the banks of the North Canadian River close to Jones in Oklahoma County, Oklahoma. The presence of three gunshot wounds upon her body clearly indicated her death was a homicide. One of these wounds contained clothing fibers and a dime that had been driven into the body by a .45 caliber bullet. Due to the fact quicklime that had been poured onto her remains in a likely attempt to accelerate decomposition, the woman became known as "Lime Lady".

She had a heart tattoo on her chest as well as an appendectomy scar. It is believed that she may have been murdered by a biker gang earlier in the year or in 1979, although some contemporary reports indicate she may have been deceased for as little as 10 days. Multiple facial reconstructions of the decedent have been created, and her DNA was extracted for profiling in 2014. The DDP began DNA testing in 2019 and was able to generate a usable profile by the end of the year.

It was announced on January 30, 2020, that the victim was identified as 21-year-old Tamara Lee Tigard, a member of the US Army, last known to reside in Las Vegas, Nevada.

Ginger Bibb, aka "Phoenix Jane Doe (2004)"

On April 21, 2004, a woman's skeletal remains were found rolled up in a carpet in Phoenix, Arizona. In February 2020, she was identified as Ginger Lynn Bibb.

Gary Herbst, aka "Barron County John Doe (2017)"
On December 3, 2017, a fragment of a human skull was found on the driveway of a rural residence in Dallas, Wisconsin. Investigators determined that it belonged to a white or Asian-American male between 35 and 55 years old. Investigators determined the cause of death as homicide by a gunshot wound to the head. Forensic genealogy began on February 25, 2020, and a potential candidate was revealed in less than two days.

On June 23, 2020, the remains were positively identified as those of Gary Albert Herbst. This also marks the first Doe to be identified through the project who did not have a forensic reconstruction made.

On November 19, 2020, Gary's son and wife, Austin and Connie, were charged with second-degree murder in his homicide.

Larry Porter, aka "Butler County John Doe (1997)"

On May 18, 1997, the decomposed body of a middle-aged white male was found in the Great Miami River in Butler County, Ohio. He had a surgical scar on the bone over the right eye and an "unusually" protruding chin. He also suffered from cirrhosis. All of his teeth had also recently been extracted. He was found wearing blue jeans, white Fruit of the Loom underwear, a brown belt, and a necklace with a metal clasp. He was also found wearing a watch with the band and outer frame present; however, the inner case and face were gone. The DDP was asked to assist with the case in June 2019.

In September 2020, through a DNA match to relatives, he was identified as Larry Joe Porter from Dayton, Ohio, who had lost touch with his family while traveling around the area of Butler County. According to a coroner, his death was consistent with being struck by a vehicle and is not considered homicidal in nature.

Anthony Armbrust, aka "Park County John Doe (1974)" 
On February 14, 1974, the decomposing remains of a young or middle-aged man were found by a group of hikers at the bottom of a steep slope near US Route 285 (US 285) in Grant, Colorado. He was found wearing blue jeans, a long-sleeve shirt, long johns, and boots. He had died sometime during late 1973, about four months prior.

Investigators could not find any definitive signs of foul play. No vehicles or personal effects were found nearby, either.

On October 20, 2020, he was identified as Anthony John Armbrust III. Armbrust was a leader of a metaphysical church in San Diego, California. Armbrust had apparently made a suicide pact with his wife, Renee Armbrust, after learning that he had emphysema, which he thought was terminal. Renee is still missing to this day. He sent a letter to his church, asking them to retrieve some belongings as well as a German Shepherd puppy he had in his apartment in Golden, Colorado. He stated that he wished to commit suicide in the Colorado Mountains by "being taken by God".

During genealogy research, the project found that Armbrust had many German and Hungarian ancestors. They also found that one of his highest matches on GEDMatch had been adopted at some point during his life.

James Hamm, aka "Lee County John Doe (1984)" 

On November 17, 1984, the skull and various other skeletal remains of a white male were discovered in a wooded area in Giddings, Texas. His weight, eye color and hair color could not be ascertained. The man had been dead for approximately six months, and a cause of death could not be ascertained. The man had a unique frontal bone which made a sharp dip at the bridge of his nose, which would have caused a rightward deviating nose. Police were able to create a reconstructive sketch of what the man may have looked like in 2008. His case was taken on by the DDP in June 2019.

On October 21, 2020, the man was conclusively identified as James L. Hamm after the project was able to find a brother on FamilyTreeDNA in June. James's brother, who was living in Florida, had said that his brother had been missing since 1984, the same year the skeletal remains were discovered. After DNA was compared between the two men, they were conclusively found to be brothers, and Doe was identified as James.

2021 identifications

James Freund and Pamela Buckley, aka "Sumter County Does" 

On August 9, 1976, a pair of young adults were found on a narrow frontage road between Sumter and Florence, South Carolina. They had been shot multiple times. The DDP was contacted on July 24, 2019, to assist with identification, and both were identified on January 19, 2021.

The male, nicknamed "Jock Doe", was identified as James Paul Freund, last seen in Lancaster, Pennsylvania.

The female was identified as Pamela Mae Buckley, last seen in Colorado Springs, Colorado.

Wendy Stephens, aka "Jane Doe B-10" 

On March 21, 1984, the skeletal remains of a teenage girl were discovered in a grassy area which is now the Seattle–Tacoma International Airport in Seattle, Washington. She was believed to be a possible victim of serial killer, Gary Ridgway. Ridgway had stated that he picked up the girl (who he stated that he assumed was in her 20s) on the side of the US 101 sometime in 1983. He later strangled her to death and buried her near the baseball field where she was found. Investigators are unsure of Ridgway's actual involvement in her death.

The DDP began testing on the remains on June 12, 2020, and, on January 25, 2021, she was identified as Wendy Stephens, aged 14, of Denver, Colorado. Thus far, she is the youngest decedent to have been identified by the project.

Erica Hunt, aka "Evangeline Parish Jane Doe" 
On December 30, 2018, the partially buried, skeletal remains of a woman were found in a rural area a distance from Ville Platte, Louisiana. They had been buried in an old barn. She was estimated to be of Cajun and African-American ancestry and was between 25 and 35 years old. Her weight, height, hair color, and eye color could not be ascertained. Investigators initially believed that she had been buried on the property for up to 10 years. A witness also gave detectives information, saying that the owner of the property which she was found had been involved with high risk females. The DDP was asked to assist with identification on August 10, 2019.

She was identified on February 5, 2021, as Erica Nicole Hunt of Opelousas, Louisiana. She had gone missing on July 4, 2016.

Dennis McConn, aka "Jackson County John Doe (1978)" 

On August 15, 1978, a group of loggers found the bones of a middle-aged man near Knapp, Jackson County, Wisconsin. His skull, lower mandible, and various vertebras were found. The cause of death could not be ascertained but was deemed a homicide based on the circumstances. He was estimated to be between 28 and 52 years old. Most other details could not be ascertained with what little bones were found; however, it is believed that he may have had a pierced ear, due to a silver Medi-Stud earring being found close by. The DDP was asked to assist with identification of his remains in May 2019.

He was tentatively identified by the project in February 2021, and his identity was announced on March 31, 2021, as Dennis Regan McConn of Kenosha, Wisconsin. He had been reported missing in 1977.

Jenifer Denton, aka "Charlene" 

On August 5, 1988, the skeletal remains of a young or middle-aged African-American female were found in a sparsely populated area along Beaver Creek in the Willow Slough Fish and Wildlife Area in Morocco, Indiana. She was found with another individual by the name of Tony. She had black hair. Her weight and eye color could not be ascertained. She was described as having good dental hygiene. She was found wearing a pair of Jordache jeans with a safety pin with the number 450 stamped on it. The project was asked to assist with identification in May 2020.

On March 6, 2021, it was announced that "Charlene" had been identified as Jenifer Noreen Denton of Joliet, Illinois. She had gone missing in 1987.

Shirley Soosay, aka "Kern County Jane Doe (1980)" 

On July 14, 1980, the body of a woman originally thought to be of Hispanic ethnicity was found in an almond orchard in Delano, California. She had been sexually assaulted, stabbed to death, and deceased for approximately one day. She had shoulder-length brown hair and brown eyes, as well as two professionally done tattoos, one of a heart with the name "Shirley" inside, and the words "Love you" and "Seattle" on one arm, and the other of a rose with the words "Mother" and "I love you" above and beneath the rose, respectively, on the other arm. She was found wearing a pink blouse, a pair of blue denim pants, blue socks, white slip-on shoes, a white panty girdle, and multicolor panties. She may have used the names "Becky" or "Rebecca Ochoa" and may have been employed at an apple orchard.

In 2015, it was announced that DNA found on the woman's body, as well as DNA from a woman found in Ventura County, California, were linked to murderer Wilson Chouest. He was convicted in 2018 of their murders and sentenced to life in prison. Chouest claimed that he did not know the victims.

The DDP was tasked with assisting in the woman's identification in July 2018, but genealogy research did not begin until May 2019. It was discovered at that point that the decedent was not Hispanic but of First Nations ancestry, most likely Cree. On April 23, 2021, it was announced that Kern County Jane Doe had been identified as Shirley Ann Soosay of Maskwacis, Alberta, Canada, after Soosay's niece recognized a reconstruction of her on a public outreach announcement by the DDP. Soosay is one of the first decedents of First Nations ancestry to be identified by forensic genealogy, as well as the first to be identified after the project reached out to the public for potential leads.

John Brandenburg Jr., aka "Brad" 

On October 18, 1983, the bodies of four young men were discovered partially buried in a shallow grave near US 41 in rural Newton County, Indiana, by a pair of mushroom hunters. Each victim was discovered to have been buried for several months, buried face upward, with sections of their bodies exposed and loosely covered in loose soil and brush. The victims were linked to a serial killer known as the "Highway Murderer". One victim wore a parka, while the others wore clothing implying that they had died in the spring or summer. Two of the victims were soon identified as Michael Bauer and John Bartlett—both murdered in March 1983. The DDP was tasked with the identifications of both unidentified decedents—known as "Adam" and "Brad"—in late 2020 and March 2021, respectively.

The individual responsible for all four murders was later identified as Larry Eyler, who ultimately confessed to having murdered 22 young men across the Midwestern US. Eyler later confessed to his attorney that he had met the two unidentified victims by chance, and that "Brad" had been introduced to him by his alleged accomplice, Robert Little, in mid- or late-May 1983.

"Brad" was found to be a young white male, most likely aged between 17 and 28 years old. He had medium length, reddish or auburn, wavy hair. He had received several dental fillings and had severely fractured his nose and left ankle during his life. He also had two known tattoos on his right forearm: one a crudely inscribed cross with two circular marks, the other a rectangle or U-shape with a single circular mark.

On April 2, 2021, DNA from this individual was uploaded to GEDmatch. Less than a month later, "Brad" was conclusively identified as 19-year-old John Ingram Brandenburg Jr. of Chicago, Illinois.

Karen Knippers, aka "Pulaski County Jane Doe (1981)" 

On May 25, 1981, the body of a young white (with possible Native-American and Hispanic admixture) female was discovered in a low water crossing near Highway MM, just north of Dixon, Missouri. She had been beaten and strangled to death with a pair of pantyhose. She had black hair and brown or hazel eyes. She was also found to have a slightly darker complexion and high cheek bones. She also had a full upper denture plate. She was found wearing a dark blue long-sleeved blouse with white pinstripes, blue jeans, blue bikini panties, and a bra with the name "Jubel", "Julie", or "Juliet" written on it. Isotope testing determined that she had only lived in Missouri for a few years before her demise, and was likely from the Southeastern US, between Texas, Georgia, and Florida.

The DDP began investigating her identity in May 2019. Investigations uncovered an extensive family tree during their investigation.

On May 25, 2021, she was positively identified as 32-year-old Karen Kaye Knippers of St. Louis, Missouri.

Dawn Plonsky Wilkerson, aka "Simpson County Jane Doe" 

On October 9, 2001, the skeletal remains of a young white female were found by a survey crew at the bottom of the shoulder of I-65 near the Tennessee state line in rural Simpson County, Kentucky. The cause of death was not ascertained, but the case was deemed a homicide due to the circumstances. She had been deceased for between two weeks and two months. She had long reddish-brown or reddish-blonde hair. She also had a healed fracture on her upper right arm, and a tattoo of the outline of a rose on her left breast. She had a scar on her face and right wrist. She was missing multiple teeth and had very poor dental health. She also had given birth to a child in the past and may have been pregnant when she died. She was found wearing a white or tan shirt, blue cotton shorts, and black sandals. Two rings were also found near the body: a gold wedding-style band and a sterling silver ring in a guilloche cigar band style, with a painted blue enamel background with flowers and leaves. The silver ring was traced to the Vargas Manufacturing Company in Providence, Rhode Island.

Her case was taken on by the project in May 2019. Isotope testing found that she may have been native to the Great Lakes region or New England.

On July 30, 2021, it was announced that the woman had been identified as Dawn Clare Plonsky Wilkerson of Nashville, Tennessee. Plonsky was 10 years older than the projected age estimate.

Laura Jordan, aka "Phoenix Jane Doe (2017)" 

On July 9, 2017, a middle-aged or elderly white woman was found deceased behind a residence in downtown Phoenix, Arizona. She had only been deceased for a few hours. She had long brown hair, but her eye color could not be ascertained. She had a multichromatic tattoo on her left-upper chest of a rose with the name "Stuart", as well as an illegible three letter word. Her lower right leg had a monochromatic tattoo of the words "Laura N Layla". She was found wearing a white shirt with green dots or sequins, a green shirt, a pair of black pants, possibly Dickies brand, a white bra, a pair of polarized white sunglasses, and a pair of gray K-Swiss brand shoes with blue laces. She also had a green hair tie around her left wrist as well as an orange and black hair tie.

The project was asked to assist with her identification in April 2021. Genealogical research was conducted with the participation of students from the University of New Haven as interns. Among the hurdles faced in this case were endogamy and difficulties finding public records.

On September 1, 2021, it was announced that she had been identified as 62-year-old Laura Jean Jordan. She had died of heat exhaustion.

John C. Kraicinski, aka "Luther" 
On July 19, 1989, the decomposed remains of a young white male were discovered behind a residence in the weeds near Flat Rock Run Creek in Caledonia, Ohio, by a group of children who were canoeing down the creek. The cause of death could not be determined due to decomposition, although investigators noticed a mark on his neck, suggesting foul play. The creek was also very shallow, discounting the possibility that he drowned. He had brown or black hair and a slight beard. He was found wearing a flannel, short-sleeved, red and black, striped shirt, multicolored, a knitted sweater with diamond and zigzag designs, a pair of blue jeans, dark red, ribbed socks, and a pair of black Adidas sneakers. Investigators believe that he was not from the area, as he did not match any missing persons reports.

The DDP began assisting with the man's identification around July 2019. Tissue samples were sent to DNA Solutions and additional extraction was performed at the ICMP in The Hague. It was ascertained that the decedent had Eastern European ancestry and a family with a missing relative was identified by mid-October 2020.

The man's identity was revealed as 34-year-old John C. Kraicinski. He was last seen in 1989 at his father's home in Galion, Ohio. Kraicinski suffered from a mental illness and had a habit of wandering, sometimes out of state. He was not reported missing as his family assumed that he started a new life elsewhere.

Francis Wayne Alexander, aka "Body 5"

Francis Wayne Alexander (b. March 11, 1955) was one of the final six unidentified victims of serial killer John Wayne Gacy. His remains were recovered from the crawlspace of Gacy's house in Norwood Park Township, Cook County, Illinois, on December 26, 1978, and labeled simply as Body 5, as his were the fifth set of remains unearthed from beneath Gacy's property. His identification was announced on October 25, 2021. Alexander had been living in Chicago at the time of his death but was originally from North Carolina.

Alexander's precise date of death is estimated to have occurred anytime between early 1976 and March 15, 1977. However, no evidence exists of his being alive after 1976. Moreover, the fact the trench in which his body was discovered was dug by Gacy employee and victim Gregory Godzik shortly after the commencement of Godzik's employment at Gacy's contracting firm on or about November 22, 1976, and before Godzik's own murder on December 12, 1976, indicates Alexander's death most likely occurred between November 1976 and March 15, 1977 (the date the victim discovered directly above the body of Alexander was murdered).

John Lindberg Scott, aka "Delafield John Doe"
In September 1977, an unidentified man was involved in a police pursuit when he lost control of his car and crashed in Delafield, Wisconsin. The vehicle had been stolen in Gurnee, Illinois. The Waukesha County Medical Examiner's Office approached the project in 2019 and a sister of the decedent was identified by 2021. The decedent was identified as 27-year-old John Lindberg Scott from Bristol, Tennessee.

Richard Bunts/Bunce, aka "Hudson John Doe"
On August 16, 2019, excavations on a real estate development site in Hudson, Ohio, uncovered the fossilized, skeletal remains of a male subject. Due to the state of the remains, it was believed that the decedent had been deceased for at least 50 to 75 years. According to Dr. Lisa Kohler, the medical examiner for Summit County, there were reports of people being buried on the property in the mid-1800s.

On November 15, 2021, the DDP, in conjunction with the Hudson Police Department, announced that the decedent had been identified as Richard Bunts/Bunce, who died in 1852 and was buried in what was then the family plot. This case is currently the oldest to be solved by the organization to date.

Stephen Patrick Archer, aka "Rohnert Park John Doe"
On January 2, 2015, the body of a white male was found along an access road on Commerce Boulevard in Rohnert Park, California. He had a full gray beard, but, although partially bald, the rest of his hair was brown. He wore prescription, aviator-style glasses with a metal frame. A black mountain bike with a towable child carrier attached was found near the body. A number of journals were in the carrier containing writing indicating the deceased had a keen interest in mathematics, physics, and science. Authorities speculated the man was a transient traveling through the area.

In November 2021, the project identified the man as 48-year-old Stephen Patrick Archer of Seattle, Washington; his identity was released on December 9, 2021. Little information is available about his life, but investigators do not consider his death suspicious.

Baseline Road John Doe
On September 11, 1983, a murder victim believed to be about 50 years old was found in a field near Baseline Road and South Central Avenue in Phoenix, Arizona. He had been bludgeoned to death in a drunken altercation. He was identified in November 2021 and his identity was withheld from the public as his family requested privacy.

Kim Ryan Casey, aka "Smith County John Doe"
On December 23, 2004, juveniles found a decomposed human skeleton in a barn in a wooded area near the intersection of US 69 and Farm to Market Road 2813 in southern Tyler, Texas. A blue jacket, blue jeans, a black baseball cap, and brown Rockport shoes were found on the skeleton. It was estimated the man died months earlier that same year.

On December 14, 2021, he was identified as 52-year-old Kim Ryan Casey, a homeless man. According to authorities, he died of natural causes.

Frank Little Jr., aka "Twinsburg John Doe"
On February 18, 1982, the partial remains of an unidentified African-American male were discovered by workers at a nearby business behind a now closed establishment at 3047 Cannon Road in Twinsburg, Ohio. The deceased's body, which showed evidence of stabbing, blunt force trauma, and postmortem fire, had been dismembered before being stuffed into the garbage bag. The deceased may have had a noticeably humped back or slouched posture due to kyphosis. Investigators theorize the man or his killer may have worked at the former Chrysler Stamping Plant in Twinsburg.

On December 14, 2021, he was identified as 39-year-old Frank "Frankie" Little Jr., a native of Cleveland who was a guitarist for the R&B group the O'Jays in the 1960s. The circumstances surrounding his disappearance are unclear, but police are now investigating his murder in order to catch his killer.

2022 identifications

Stephanie Judson, aka "Kent County Jane Doe"
On July 31, 1997, a maintenance worker picking up trash in a roadside park in Ada Township, Michigan, found human remains in a wooded area behind some outbuildings. Authorities found only a dark blue leg warmer near the remains. Her teeth showed a lack of dental care, and she likely died sometime between March and August 1996.

On January 4, 2022, the Kent County Sheriff's Office revealed that Doe had been identified as 31-year-old Stephanie Renee Judson. She was born in Benton Harbor but later moved to Grand Rapids, but, at present, the circumstances surrounding her disappearance and apparent murder remain under investigation.

Shelly Rae Christian, aka "Matilda"
On November 6, 1994, rabbit hunters discovered human skeletal remains in a cornfield near a wooded area just north of I-96 in Wright Township, Ottawa County, Michigan. The deceased was female and most likely died between May and September 1994. The decedent was identified on January 20, 2022, as 29-year-old Shelly Rae Christian of Minneapolis, Minnesota, who was last seen by her family in October 1993.

Gordon Rexrode, aka "Gwinnett County John Doe (2003)"
On June 20, 2003, human skeletonized remains were discovered in a storm basin along Craig Drive in Lawrenceville, Georgia. A homemade pipe commonly used to smoke crack cocaine was recovered near the remains. On the body was a short sleeved, cotton "Christopher Hawes" shirt, originally white or beige with a fine blue plaid pattern, and athletic socks. On February 3, 2022, he was identified as 70-year-old Gordon Rexrode, a homeless vagrant originally from North Carolina.

Roberta Seyfert, aka "Lilydale Jane Doe"
On June 11, 1976, the badly decomposed body of a young woman was discovered by workers dredging the Mississippi River near the Mendota Bridge close to Lilydale, Minnesota. The decedent's death was estimated to have occurred several weeks prior to the discovery of her body. She was found dressed only in blue shorts, half socks, and light shoes. The bones in her left leg were fractured. The cause of death was determined to be a probable drowning. The decedent was buried in Oakland Cemetery in Saint Paul, Minnesota, on January 20, 1977, as "Jane Doe". On February 4, 2022, she was identified as 22-year-old Roberta Seyfert who was born in 1954 in Tucson, Arizona.

Steven Gooch, aka "Cliff"/"Marion, Flathead County John Doe 2003"
On October 26, 2003, a couple who were out hunting near Red Gate Road in Marion, Montana, found a duffel bag, several items, a shoe, and a skull. Investigations from local officers uncovered even more items and additional bones, which, upon testing, were revealed to belong to an unidentified male who died in an inconclusive manner between 1995 and 2002. The investigators over the case nicknamed the decedent "Cliff Doe".

In February 2022, the decedent was identified as 29-year-old Steven Gooch, who was reported missing by his family in 1996. They had lost contact with him the year prior while he was on a possible trip to Las Vegas, Nevada. Investigations are underway to determine how he had died.

Trinity Bellwoods Park Jane Doe
A Caucasian woman between the ages of 27 and 49 who was discovered unconscious in a Trinity Bellwoods Park, Ontario, in June 2020. This individual was determined to have died of natural causes. She was identified in February 2022, although her identity has been withheld from the public as her family have requested their privacy be respected.

T.J. Emily, aka "St. Louis John Doe"
On March 7, 1992, the skeletal remains of a teenager or young adult were found in a vacant building in the Central West End of St. Louis, Missouri. While the manner of death was determined to be homicidal in nature, authorities were unable to identify the decedent at the time.

On March 25, 2022, he was identified as 18-year-old T.J. Emily, a resident of St. Louis who had disappeared on March 25, 1990, while en route to visit his uncle. The identification was made in conjunction with the St. Louis Metropolitan Police Department, and it was coincidentally announced on the same date as Emily's disappearance. The investigation into his murder is ongoing.

Patricia "Patsy" Skiple, aka "Blue Pacheco Jane Doe 1993" 
On June 3, 1993, a trucker stopping to relieve himself found the body of a white, possibly Hispanic woman in a turnout on Pacheco Pass Highway near Gilroy, California. The manner of death was determined to be homicide by strangulation, and it seemed that the woman was dumped at the location she was found in. Her blue denim clothing suggested that the woman was homeless and a transient. She was given the nickname "Blue Pacheco" after the highway she was found on as well as her clothing. In 2006, serial killer Keith Hunter Jesperson confessed to her murder in a letter to authorities. In this letter, Jesperson claimed that the woman was named "Carla" or "Cindy". Jesperson met the woman at a truckstop on I-5 in Corning, California and then gave her a ride after buying lunch for her. He strangled Jane Doe in Williams, California, before dumping her body.

On April 18, 2022, she was identified as 45-year old Patricia "Patsy" Skiple, who walked out of her home in Molalla, Oregon, in 1992 and never returned. In 2007, Jesperson pled guilty to Skiple's murder and is now serving multiple life sentences at the Oregon State Penitentiary.

Ronald Wayne Jager, aka "Allegan County John Doe" 
On July 31, 2014, partial human remains and a bone with three teeth were discovered by a jogger running along the beach of Ganges Township, Michigan, who immediately reported the finding to the local authorities. They were then sent to the Western Michigan University Pathology Department for DNA testing, but, as this produced no results, the remains were labelled "unidentified" and stored away.

The university contacted the DDP in mid-2019 to help with identification, and, after several rounds of testing, they identified the decedent as 59-year-old Ronald Wayne Jager on April 22, 2022. Jager had been reported missing on August 1, 2000, after he failed to return home from a fishing trip, with his boat found three days later. Due to the circumstances of his death, it is believed that it was accidental in nature.

Tommy Gayle Pool Jr, aka "Valencia Road John Doe (2019)" 
On February 26, 2019, the body of a white man was found in a homeless encampment in Tucson, Arizona. His age was estimated to be between 32 and 50 years old, although he may have appeared older. His hair was gray or partially gray and he had brown eyes. One of his upper front teeth had been replaced with a porcelain crown.

On June 21, 2022, he was identified as Tommy Gayle Pool Jr.

Carl Junior Isaacs Jr., aka "Rock County John Doe" 

On November 26, 1995, the skeletal remains of a young man were found by hunters in a wooded area along Turtle Creek in Bradford, Wisconsin, near Clinton. His skeleton was lying on his stomach with his arms up over his head. The man was dressed in a plaid flannel jacket, a black Venom concert T-shirt, boxer underwear with a Bart Simpson design, and gray urban camouflage fatigues. The jacket partially covered the man's head and back. One black 1994 Nike Air Bond basketball shoe lay beside the skeleton. The man carried a pendant made from a dinner fork, shaped like the head of a goat. Other items found with the body were cigarette butts, a Budweiser disposable butane lighter with the caption "Proud to be Your Bud" printed on it, a tube of Carmex lip balm, and a black Aquatech watch. The official cause and manner of death remain undetermined. Investigators believe the young man passed out or went to sleep and was overcome by hypothermia.

The DDP was contacted in 2018 to help identify the young man. They announced a tentative identification in 2019. The man had been identified after only two weeks of genetic genealogy, however a confirmation of his identity did not occur until 2022. Margaret Press, co-founder of DDP, explained that there was no living relative close enough to meet the standards of the medical examiner. In 2019, the University of North Texas performed additional testing on the man's half-siblings. In 2021, the man's father was exhumed to provide bone samples for researchers to compare with the young man and his half-siblings.

On June 14, 2022, the Rock County Sheriff's Office announced the identification of the decedent as Carl Junior Isaacs Jr. of Delavan, Wisconsin. On April 16, 1995, Isaacs escaped from his mother's home in Walworth where he was under house arrest while serving a 5 year prison sentence for the 1991 burglary and vandalism of the Delbrook Golf Course in Delavan. He was immediately served with an arrest warrant for violating probation by a Walworth County judge that was renewed through August 2018. The investigation into the manner and circumstances surrounding Isaacs' death is ongoing.

James Everett, aka "Hennepin County John Doe (2014)" 
In September 2014, the skeletal remains of an adult male were found by a railroad electrician in an abandoned Union Pacific railroad shed located alongside railroad tracks in Rosemount, Minnesota. He was dressed in a Wilson's Leather Open Road style motorcycle jacket and ill-fitting black Wrangler boot cut jeans. His socks were lined with St. Paul Pioneer Press newspaper fragments that were dated October 19–25, 2013. A knife was found with the body of which its sheath had multiple engravings most notably the initials of "DHT". The man's autopsy revealed that he had long brown and gray hair and wore an earring in his left ear. The cause of death was declared as "unclear", but investigators believe it was natural or accidental due to the lack of trauma to the man's skeleton. The remains were eventually buried in Inver Grove Heights, Minnesota, in 2017.

The man did not have any form of identification with him. A Federal Bureau of Investigation reconstruction of his face yielded tips that were all ruled out. Investigators looked for patterns in electronic benefit card transactions among nearby stores, but that proved unsuccessful. Initial DNA profiles were also useless. In 2022, the DDP matched mitochondrial DNA to a candidate who was confirmed through DNA samples from his family. On July 13, 2022, the decedent was identified as 48-year-old James Everett from Cohocton, New York, who worked as a cook in Rochester. In 2013, Everett left home on a work trip and subsequently vanished. His family reported him missing, but the report was taken down after a Montana state trooper found him alive in the state that year. His car was found abandoned in Scott County, Minnesota, in late 2013. It's unclear how long Everett stayed in the shed he was found in or what drew him to Minnesota. The investigation into his death is ongoing.

James Chaparro, aka "Tucson Parking Lot John Doe (2019)" 
In July 2019, a man died after experiencing a cardiac arrest in the parking lot of a Tucson shopping center. His hair was gray or partially gray and he had brown eyes. Scars were noted on his outer right thigh and left knee, and a surgical plate had been used to repair a fractured left tibia. The man was wearing blue shorts and black sandals. In his possession were a black flashlight, loose change, and a key fob that included an old Mazda car key.

On July 1, 2022, he was identified as 64-year-old James "Mark" Chaparro.

Pamela Darlene Young, aka "Gregg County Jane Doe (2002)" 
On May 21, 2002, the skeletal remains of a woman were found off of Texas State Highway 135, south of Swamp City Road in the Liberty City area by geologists surveying ahead of a project to widen the highway. The Tarrant County Medical Examiner estimated the remains were those of a Caucasian or Hispanic female, of petite build, and between 16 and 30 years of age. The young woman was determined to have had an unrepaired cleft lip and palate. No clothes were found on the remains and the cause of death could not be determined. Investigators believed that the decedent died up to two years prior to being found.

Early in 2020, Lieutenant Eddie Hope reached out to the DDP to begin genetic genealogy on the decedent. A DNA profile was derived from a molar and uploaded to GEDmatch Pro where it was compared with people who uploaded their DNA profiles on GEDmatch. The genealogy in this case proved complex due to endogamy, and it took two years to narrow down the decedent's family tree to a potential candidate. Communications with a few distant DNA relatives also proved useful in identifying the decedent.

On July 21, 2022, the decedent was identified as 27-year-old Pamela Darlene Young of Arlington, Texas, an identification confirmed through her daughter. Young relocated to Texas from the Blue Ridge Mountains area and lost contact with her family. She was last seen in 1998 and is believed to have died in 2000. Young was never reported missing with no records of her existence after 1998. A person of interest in Young's case was identified with the assistance of a Texas ranger—but has been dead since 2017.

Mary Jensen, aka "Ramsey Co Jane Doe (1977)" 
On July 20, 1977, the body of a woman was recovered from the Mississippi River between Childs Road and Warner Road, St. Paul, Minnesota. Although it could not be determined how long the deceased had been in the water, investigators estimated she had probably died sometime earlier that year. She had medium length brown hair and brown or green eyes. The woman was wearing a shirt with green, red, and blue vertical stripes; high waisted blue jeans; brown knee high stockings; and size 8 to 9 shoes. Cause and manner of death were not disclosed.

In March, 2021, Butch Huston of the Ramsey County medical examiner's office reached out to the DDP and submitted DNA extract from Jane Doe to a series of lab processes to create a DNA profile. From the beginning, the team faced challenges with the genealogy involved in working limited and distant matches, including immigrant grandparents from Finland and over 35 Italian connections.

On August 2, 2022, the decedent was identified as 23-year-old Mary Jensen.

Jeffery Peterson, aka "Summit County John Doe" 
On July 10, 2016, a group of hikers trekking through the Sky Chutes section of the White River National Forest in northwestern Colorado found what appeared to be a human skull. Further searching revealed some additional skeletal remains, a backpack and a handgun with its serial number scratched off, but no means of identification. Due to this, the remains were given to the coroner's office for identification, but this provided no results. Over the years, several institutions tracked down various leads until they eventually located potential family members of the decedent.

On September 13, 2022, the decedent was identified as 53-year-old Jeffery "Jeff" Lee Peterson, an executive specialized in E-commerce. After losing a significant sum of money during the financial crisis of 2007–2008, he announced that he would move to Belize and never return, ceasing contact with his family . His cause of death was determined to be a self-inflicted gunshot wound.

Frank Beck, aka "Downtown Phoenix John Doe" 
On October 19, 2004, the body of a man was found on Central Avenue in Phoenix, Arizona. Authorities were quickly able to determine that he had likely died from an accidental fall but were unable to identify him.

On October 20, 2022, the man was identified as 57-year-old Frank R. Beck, a Pennsylvania-born homeless man who had lived in the state since the 1990s.

Louis Gattaino, aka "Rock County John Doe (1981)" 
On March 13, 1981, while clearing out a concrete culvert at I-90 and Rocky City Road 23 in Beaver Creek Township, Minnesota, a department of transportation worker found human skeletal remains. The ditch and culvert were last cleaned on October 21, 1980, and no remains were noted at that time. His death was considered to have happened in 1980 or 1981 and it was determined that it was a probable homicide.

On December 20, 2022, the decedent was identified as Louis Anthony Gattaino, who went missing in 1971 from Omaha, Nebraska, when he was 25 years old. Gattaino was known to be a notorious 1960s bank robber.

2023 identifications

Daniel Garza Gonzales, aka "Saginaw Co John Doe"
On March 13, 1973 the body of a young male estimated to be aged between 25 and 35 was found by a fisherman in the Saginaw River in Zilwaukee Township, Saginaw County, Michigan. He had been deceased for approximately six weeks, and had been shot seven times in addition to receiving blunt trauma.

On January 5, 2023, the decedent was identified via matches with familial DNA samples as 28-year-old Vietnam veteran Daniel Garza Gonzales (b. March 15, 1944). Investigations into his murder are ongoing.

Katherine Alston, aka "Bedford Jane Doe"
On October 6, 1971, the body of a young woman was found hidden underneath a logging trail near Bedford, New Hampshire. Her cause of death could be ascertained, but authorities have always believed her death homicidal in nature and that the decedent had been killed between one to three months prior.

After multiple attempts to identify her, the DNA Doe Project took up the case, and in January 2023, the Jane Doe was identified as 26-year-old Katherine "Kathy" Ann Alston of Boston, Massachusetts. Alston had disappeared while en route to meet her family at the Logan International Airport in the mid-to-late summer of 1971. Investigators are currently seeking information to help resolve the case.

Earl Pizzoferrato, aka "Jefferson County John Doe"
On March 10, 2019, a golf bag containing the remains of a man washed ashore of Douglas Lake near Dandridge, Tennessee. Although the exact cause of death could not be determined, authorities concluded that it was likely homicidal nature.

After it was handed over to the DNA Doe Project, they were able to establish that the man had likely been adopted, identifying his biological parents. Further research was conducted, and in January 2023, the decedent was identified as 28-year-old Earl Joseph Pizzoferrato. Investigations into his murder are ongoing.

Dorothy Ricker, aka "Lake Michigan Jane Doe"
On October 24, 1997, the body of a woman was found floating in Lake Michigan near a break wall in Manistee, Michigan. She had no clothes, with the exception of one earring, but an autopsy determined that the cause of death was accidental drowning via asphyxiation. After failing to receive tips about the case, it was eventually handed over to the DNA Doe Project in 2020, which partnered up with Astrea Forensics to help identify the decedent.

On January 9, 2023, she was identified as 26-year-old Dorothy Lynn Thyng Ricker, of Chicago. She was last seen on October 2, 1997, in St. Francis, Wisconsin, and according to a couple of officers who talked to her at the time, she was vacationing and enjoying the lakefront. She had been reported missing after her car was found abandoned on the following day.

Ricky Leslie, aka "Hardin County John Doe (2006)" 
On December 30, 2006, the body of a man was found on the side of the road along northbound Interstate 65 near mile marker 95, east of Elizabethtown, Kentucky. Forensic investigators determined that he was white, 50-70 years old, and stood around 6 feet tall , but weighed only 140 pounds. There was no evidence of trauma to the man's body. He was dressed in a red plaid, insulated flannel shirt, black belt, gray polo shirt, and State Street brand brown shoes. The man had died of natural causes weeks prior to his discovery. 

In 2021, the Hardin County Coroner's Office contacted DNA Doe Project to request assistance in identifying the man and a biological sample was sent to its lab for genetic genealogy. Pedigree collapse was observed in the man's family tree which made the case somewhat difficult, but a candidate for the decedent was eventually discovered in July 2022. On February 6, 2023, the decedent was identified as 63-year-old Ricky Allen Leslie. Leslie had been living in Elizabethtown prior to his death. His last address was near where his body was found.

Joyce Rodgers, aka "Carson City Jane Doe" 
On March 17, 2015, partially decomposed human remains were found in a shallow grave in Carson City, Nevada. They were determined to belong to a woman aged between 40 and 70 years of age, but the decedent's identity and cause of death were unknown.

On February 17, 2023, with the help of DNA Doe Project, the decedent was identified as 72-year-old Joyce A. Rodgers Annis, a homeless woman who was living in the area. Her husband, fellow transient Edward Barton, claimed that he had buried her body after she had died from an illness. Her identity was revealed alongside that of another decedent in an unrelated case.

Edith Patten, aka "Woodlawn Cemetery Jane Doe" 
The partial skeletal remains of a young woman were discovered by construction workers in Sanford, Maine on May 4, 2017. The remains were discovered within a collapsed Victorian era casket alongside nickel-plated coffin keys. Historical records indicated the location of discovery had been a cemetery which had seen interments until 1903, although all the graves had been relocated to another cemetery between 1900 and 1931, strongly indicating the decedent had died in the late 19th century, and that her coffin had simply been overlooked within the transferral process.

In February 2023, Woodlawn Cemetery Jane Doe was identified as 24-year-old Edith Patten (b. April 1867), who had died of tuberculosis on November 24, 1891. Her identity was established via genetic genealogy.

Kurt Aken, aka "Metson Lake John Doe" 
On June 21, 2021, a landscaper cleaning the grounds of the Golden Gate Park in San Francisco, California found the body of a homeless man in a makeshift campsite. There was no sign of trauma on the body, and the man seemingly died weeks prior to discovery.

The agency handling the case contacted the DNA Doe Project, which used the man's DNA to link him to a close relative. Because of this, in March 2023, he was identified as 45-year-old Kurt Jerome Aken.

Ongoing cases
Following is a chart of the DDP's ongoing cases, along with an indication of where each case is in the process:

Other case involvements and collaborations
Around 2017 to 2018, the DDP tried to assist on identifying Snohomish County John Doe (2007) where he was found in the Sultan Basin, but, at some point, they failed to do it. Then it was stalled and removed from their list. After that, the Snohomish County Medical Examiner's Office sent his jaw and hipbone to DNA Solutions. They were successful and found that the man has ties to the Midwest's Amish and Mennonite communities, Texas, Louisiana, and patches in the Pacific Northwest.

In October 2017, the organization was contacted by the Snohomish County Medical Examiner's Office and Sheriff's Office for assistance with the case of Beckler River Jane Doe, a woman whose partial cranium was discovered on October 10, 2009, north of Skykomish, Washington. Initial DNA extraction attempts were unsuccessful due to contamination with nonhuman DNA. In June 2021, investigators approached Othram, a company that has had success extracting DNA from more challenging skeletal remains. Jane Doe was identified by June 2022 as Alice Lou Williams, a woman who disappeared mysteriously from her recreational cabin near Lake Loma in July 1981.

The project was involved in the case of Phoenix Jane Doe (1997). However, she was sooner identified as Bertha Alicia Holguín Barroterán after relatives in New Mexico found out about the case due to greater media exposure.

The project was involved in the case of Kingsport John Doe (2003). The case was solved through an amateur sleuth's tip and the decedent identified as Jerry D. Holbert from Charleston, West Virginia.

The project was involved in the identification of a severed leg found floating in Buena Vista Lake in Kern County, California, on July 28, 2018. No other body parts were located after an extensive search. The leg was later matched to remains found on July 12, 2020, belonging to Shirley Mae Cassel from Santa Ana, California. Cassel was reported missing on August 21, 2017, after leaving her residence in Santa Ana.

The project was involved in the case of Gwinnett County Jane Doe (2021), but she was identified while still in the "pending" phase as Brittany Michelle Davis, who was reported missing by her family on March 16, 2020. Her fiance, Michael Lee Wilkerson, was arrested and charged with her murder.

The project was involved in the case of "John Lehman" (Burnett Co John Doe 1999), a man who lived under an alias. In March 2022, he was identified as a drifter named Robert James Pearson, who had never been reported missing by his family, using his fingerprint before the sequencing of his DNA was completed.

In April 2022, the project and Wyndham Forensic Group signed a contract with the Canadian Armed Forces's Casualty Identification Program to help the Canadian Department of National Defence in its mandate to identify Canadian service personnel from world wars I and II, as well as the Korean War.

The project partnered with Intermountain Forensics by June 2022 to help on the 1921 Tulsa Identification Project in Tulsa, Oklahoma. The goal of the collaboration and the latter project is to identify victims of the 1921 Tulsa race massacre. The city of Tulsa organized several exhumations in mid-2021.

Press and Fitzpatrick worked with Lawrence Wein, professor of operations, information, and technology at Stanford Graduate School of Business and Mine Su Ertürk, a PhD student, on a paper proposing a new mathematical search method to help genealogists in forensic genealogy investigations.

On September 19, 2022, Othram announced that Alachua County John Doe, a skeleton discovered in Alachua County, Florida, in 1979 with a noose near it, was identified as Ralph Tufano of New York. It is unknown why he traveled to Alachua County and if his death was murder or suicide. The case was originally handled by the DDP. Sequencing of the decedent's genetic material was difficult in this case.

The project worked on the case of a dismembered unidentified male found in St. Tammany Parish, Louisiana in 2016 but the decedent was identified by the police in October 2022 as Kleanthis Konstantinidis after the decedent's severed foot was discovered in a different location.

On December 20, 2022, DNA Doe Project announced a collaboration with Ramapo College of New Jersey and Palisades Interstate Parkway Police. They would begin their program on Spring 2023 for 15 weeks. There are 2 John Does revealed for the program so far. On February 28, 2023, DNA Doe Project, Pima County Office of the Medical Examiner and Ramapo College of New Jersey announced on adding 3 more John Does from Pima County, Arizona.

The project was involved in the case of Jonesport John Doe (2000); however, the lack of close matches on DNA databases couldn't lead to any further investigation. The decedent was identified in December 2022 as Phillip Kahn by the FBI, using fingerprints and dental records.

See also
 Unidentified decedent

References

External links
 DNA Doe Project web site

2017 establishments in the United States
Forensics organizations
Missing people organizations
Non-profit organizations based in California
Organizations established in 2017
Person databases